South East Queensland (SEQ) is a bio-geographical, metropolitan, political and administrative region of the state of Queensland in Australia, with a population of approximately 3.8 million people out of the state's population of 5.1 million. The area covered by South East Queensland varies, depending on the definition of the region, though it tends to include Queensland's three largest cities: the capital city Brisbane; the Gold Coast; and the Sunshine Coast.

South East Queensland was the first part of Queensland to be settled and explored by Europeans. Settlements initially arose in the Brisbane and Ipswich areas with activity by European immigrants spreading in all directions from there.  Various industries such as timber cutting and agriculture quickly developed at locations around the region from the 1840s onwards.  Transport links have been shaped by the range of terrain found in South East Queensland.

The economy of South East Queensland supports and relies on a wide diversity of agricultural manufacturing industries, commerce and tourism. The region has an integrated public transport system, TransLink. The gross domestic product is $170 billion.

Definitions
The term South East Queensland has no equivalent political representation. The area covers many lower house seats at the federal and state levels. As Queensland has no upper house, there are no Legislative Council provinces or regions to bear the name either.

South Eastern Queensland, as an interim Australian bioregion, comprises  and includes the Moreton Basin, South Burnett, and the Scenic Rim along with ten other biogeographic subregions. It extends as far north as Gladstone, and south into north-eastern New South Wales.

History

South East Queensland was home to around 20,000 Aboriginals prior to British occupation.  The local tribes of the area were the Yugarapul of the Central Brisbane area; the Yugambeh people whose traditional lands ranged from South of the Logan River, down to the Tweed River and west to the McPherson Ranges; the Quandamooka people whose traditional lands encompassed the Moreton Bay Islands to the mouth of the Brisbane River to Tingalpa and south to the Logan River; and the Gubbi Gubbi people whose traditional lands were known to exist north of the Pine River, to Burrum River in the north, and west to the Conondale ranges.  According to history researchers the Aboriginal population declined to around 10,000 over the next 60 years.

Early explorers in the area including Matthew Flinders, Allan Cunningham, John Oxley and Patrick Logan. Around 1839, European settlers were able to move into the region. Logging was the first industry to develop.  The first railway built in Queensland linked Grandchester to Ipswich in 1865 along a narrow 1067 mm gauge.

Major floods were experienced in 1893, 1974, 2011 and 2022. In 2005, the region suffered its worst drought in recorded history.

Geography
Queensland's fifth highest peak, Mount Superbus, is located in the south of the region. The Cunningham Highway passes southwest to the Darling Downs via Cunninghams Gap. Several highways including the Bruce Highway, Warrego Highway and the Pacific Motorway link to the adjoining regions.

The region is mountainous. McPherson Range, Teviot Range, D'Aguilar Range, Little Liverpool Range, Blackall Range as well as the Springbrook Plateau and Tamborine Mountain Plateau.  Isolated volcanic peaks are found at Moogerah Peaks and the Glass House Mountains.  Along the coast are several large islands including Bribie Island, Moreton Island and North Stradbroke Island with many smaller islands in Moreton Bay.  Several major water supply and flood mitigation dams have been constructed here. The Western Corridor Recycled Water Scheme and Gold Coast Desalination Plant were built to counter the effects of drought in South East Queensland. Just over half the land is used for grazing.  South East Queensland is flood-prone.

Local government areas 

South East Queensland includes 12 adjoining local government areas (LGAs). Generally, the agglomeration/region consists of the metropolis of Brisbane (2.5 million inhabitants) and the Gold Coast (0.6 million inhabitants), Sunshine Coast (0.33 million inhabitants), Toowoomba (0.13 million inhabitants) and the Shire of Noosa (0.06 million inhabitants):

The Tweed Shire is actually within NSW but is often included in planning processes for SEQ. While not officially part of the TransLink public transport network, Surfside Buses run a seamless service across the border that appears to passengers as though it is integrated.

A highly effective integrated ticketing system for public transport has averted transport gridlock in the region.

Major cities 
The region is a complex, regional hybrid linking the Brisbane metropolitan area with several surrounding cities.  South East Queensland includes the following cities:
 Brisbane, Queensland's capital and largest city. Brisbane's metropolitan area includes the following local government areas:
City of Brisbane, the most populous local government area in the nation
City of Ipswich, home to Queensland's oldest provincial city and industrial centre, in the south-west
City of Logan, a largely residential and light industrial area in the south-east
Moreton Bay Region, a largely residential area to the north, which includes the Redcliffe Peninsula
Redland City, a residential and acreage area in the coastal south-east
 Gold Coast, Queensland's premier tourist destination and surfing mecca to the south of Brisbane.
 Sunshine Coast, another major tourist area to the north of Brisbane.
 Toowoomba, nicknamed 'The Garden City', the most populous inland city in the country after the national capital, Canberra.

New developments are currently underway at Springfield, Ecco Ripley, Yarrabilba and Flagstone. Some geographers suggest several more master-planned communities will be needed to cater for the expected population growth rates.

Airports
 Brisbane Airport – The major international gateway to the region offering services direct to California, Asia, Oceania and the Middle East.
 Gold Coast Airport – The second major gateway is one of Australia's fastest growing airport offering services to Japan, Malaysia, New Zealand, Singapore and Hong Kong.
 Sunshine Coast Airport – An airport offering services to Sydney, Melbourne and Adelaide, with international flights to New Zealand during the peak summer season. 
 Toowoomba Wellcamp Airport – The first privately funded major airport in the country. Services the Toowoomba and surrounding Darling Downs region, with a view to becoming a major international freight hub.
 Archerfield Airport – a general aviation airport located approximately 11 km south of the Brisbane CBD.
 Redcliffe Airport – a general aviation airport located on the Redcliffe Peninsula approximately 28 km from the Brisbane CBD.
 RAAF Base Amberley – the largest operational base of the air force in Australia located in south-western Ipswich approximately 50 km from the Brisbane CBD.

Industry

The region exports a number of crop products including broccoli, onion, Chinese cabbage, sweet corn and celery.  A sizeable vegetable industry is established in the Lockyer Valley. Timber cutting, mining and a range of agricultural pursuits including dairying were once prominent in South East Queensland.  Tourism, in part due to Brisbane serving as major transport and export hub and destinations such as the Gold Coast and the availability of land for industry, has grown in recent decades together with specialised skills in professional services and manufacturing.

Car dependency has a risen when the location of jobs in areas such as health and education are at distance from where the majority live.  Road transport in Brisbane relies on the car as the dominant form of transport.

Demographics
As of 2014, the population of South East Queensland is estimated to be approximately 3.4 million, meaning that between one in six and one in seven Australians call the region home. The regional population is heavily urbanised and concentrated along the coast. The three largest population centres of Brisbane, Gold Coast and the Sunshine Coast account for 90 per cent of the region's population. In the year to June 2020, the City of Ipswich was the fastest growing local government area in Queensland.

Immigration and population growth
South East Queensland is one of the fastest-growing regions in Australia. Growth in the state is fueled principally by migration from the southern states and overseas.  In 2010, South East Queensland's population grew by an average of about 1,200 new residents each week.

Between 1991 and 2016 the population rose from 1.9 million residents to 3.3 million. South East Queensland is expected to be home to 4.4 million by 2031. A 2010 report concluded that the region will reach 5.5 million people by 2051.

The population growth rate in SEQ was more than twice the rate of the rest of Queensland over the past 2 decades. More than 80% of population growth in the state between 1999-2019 occurred in SEQ. 

Population growth was putting pressure on schools and hospitals in the region in 2021.

Regional planning

South East Queensland's future development will be heavily based on the South East Queensland Regional Plan, released by the Queensland state government in 2005. The regional plan covers the period from 2009–2031 and focuses on slowing development along the coast, in order to prevent creating a 200 km city, and instead aim for growth in the west, in particular around Springfield and Beaudesert.  Infrastructure planning in South East Queensland is almost exclusively designed to facilitate trans-metropolitan travel and reduce traffic congestion.

Environment

Predominantly rural landscapes lie to the west of the urbanised coastal centres. The Lockyer Valley, a major agricultural area referred to as "South East Queensland's Salad Bowl", lies outside Brisbane. Many World Heritage listed rainforests are located along the region's southern border ranges, an area known as the Scenic Rim, such as Lamington National Park and Main Range National Park.

Within the region, the koala is listed as vulnerable.  In South East Queensland the koala is threatened by habitat loss, disease such as chlamydiosis and increased mortality due to domestic animals and motor vehicles.  The Australian Koala Foundation says the animal is threatened by mining and land development. Numbers in Redland City have seen a dramatic decline in recent years. The state government launched the Koala Conservation Plan in 2006. The plan involved the rehabilitation of cleared areas, domestic dogs containment and koala signage. Another initiative was launched in 2010 to protect and rehabilitate koala habitats by tree planting and the construction of koala friendly fencing.

According to the Intergovernmental Panel on Climate Change SEQ is one of Australia's regions most vulnerable to climate change.  After many years of water restrictions due to severe drought, the Government of Queensland lifted restrictions across the whole of South East Queensland on 1 January 2013.

See also

 Australian rules football in South East Queensland
 Daylight Saving for South East Queensland
 Rail network in South East Queensland
 Rail transport in South East Queensland
 Shopping Centres in South East Queensland
 The 200 Kilometre City

References

External links

 South East Queensland Wikibook
SEQ History South East Queensland History
South East Queensland Council of Mayors

SEQ Australia

 
Biogeography of Queensland